The World Chess Championship 1993 was one of the most controversial matches in chess history, with incumbent World Chess Champion Garry Kasparov, and official challenger Nigel Short, splitting from FIDE, the official world governing body of chess, and playing their title match under the auspices of the Professional Chess Association. In response, FIDE stripped Kasparov of his title, and instead held a title match between Anatoly Karpov and Jan Timman.

The matches were won by Kasparov and Karpov respectively. For the first time in history, there were two rival World Chess Champions, a situation which persisted until the World Chess Championship 2006.

1990 Interzonal Tournament
For the first time, the Interzonal was held as a Swiss system tournament in Manila in June and July 1990. 64 contestants played 13 rounds; the top 11 qualified for the Candidates Tournament.

{| class="wikitable"
|+ 1990 Interzonal Tournament
|-
!  !! !! Rating !! 1 !! 2 !! 3 !! 4 !! 5 !! 6 !! 7 !! 8 !! 9 !! 10 !! 11 !! 12 !! 13 !! Total
|- style="background:#ccffcc;"
| 1 || align=left| || 2680 || =26 || +42 || +3 || =14 || +29 || =5 || =2 || =11 || +8 || =12 || =6 || =9 || +16 || 9
|- style="background:#ccffcc;"
| 2 || align=left| || 2680 || −54 || +41 || +43 || +21 || +8 || +48 || =1 || =6 || =12 || =10 || =5 || +17 || =3 || 9
|- style="background:#ccffcc;"
| 3 || align=left| || 2610 || =32 || +44 || −1 || +49 || −13 || =54 || +47 || =18 || =14 || +29 || +37 || +12 || =2 || 8½
|- style="background:#ccffcc;"
| 4 || align=left| || 2610 || +20 || −21 || −13 || =46 || +33 || +24 || +7 || −8 || +30 || +18 || =11 || =6 || +12 || 8½
|- style="background:#ccffcc;"
| 5 || align=left| || 2600 || =22 || +64 || +51 || +8 || =48 || =1 || =12 || =9 || =13 || =11 || =2 || =10 || =7 || 8
|- style="background:#ccffcc;"
| 6 || align=left| || 2630 || =31 || +33 || =7 || =15 || +28 || =30 || +29 || =2 || =11 || =13 || =1 || =4 || =10 || 8
|- style="background:#ccffcc;"
| 7 || align=left| || 2585 || =38 || +62 || =6 || =16 || =17 || =18 || −4 || +19 || +48 || +21 || =10 || =11 || =5 || 8
|- style="background:#ccffcc;"
| 8 || align=left| || 2600 || +13 || +58 || +12 || −5 || −2 || =19 || +40 || +4 || −1 || =17 || =21 || =14 || +25 || 8
|- style="background:#ccffcc;"
| 9 || align=left| || 2615 || =45 || +49 || −29 || +55 || +25 || =14 || +48 || =5 || −21 || +16 || =12 || =1 || =11 || 8
|- style="background:#ccffcc;"
| 10 || align=left| || 2615 || =24 || =23 || +27 || =11 || +39 || =29 || +30 || −12 || +15 || =2 || =7 || =5 || =6 || 8
|- style="background:#ccffcc;"
| 11 || align=left| || 2615 || =44 || =32 || +22 || =10 || =21 || +13 || +14 || =1 || =6 || =5 || =4 || =7 || =9 || 8
|-
| 12 || align=left| || 2640 || +43 || +36 || −8 || +37 || =14 || +34 || =5 || +10 || =2 || =1 || =9 || −3 || −4 || 7½
|-
| 13 || align=left| || 2515 || −8 || +53 || +4 || =51 || +3 || −11 || +34 || +16 || =5 || =6 || −17 || =19 || =15 || 7½
|-
| 14 || align=left| || 2580 || +57 || =16 || +17 || =1 || =12 || =9 || −11 || =31 || =3 || =15 || +28 || =8 || =20 || 7½
|-
| 15 || align=left| || 2600 || +40 || =29 || =16 || =6 || =18 || =17 || =21 || +22 || −10 || =14 || +36 || =25 || =13 || 7½
|-
| 16 || align=left| || 2655 || +56 || =14 || =15 || =7 || =30 || =23 || +19 || −13 || +31 || −9 || +22 || +21 || −1 || 7½
|-
| 17 || align=left| || 2615 || =33 || +31 || −14 || +24 || =7 || =15 || +23 || =21 || =29 || =8 || +13 || −2 || =19 || 7½
|-
| 18 || align=left| || 2635 || =42 || =26 || =30 || +56 || =15 || =7 || =31 || =3 || +40 || −4 || =27 || =24 || +22 || 7½
|-
| 19 || align=left| || 2580 || =55 || =35 || =23 || =33 || +42 || =8 || −16 || −7 || +32 || +50 || +29 || =13 || =17 || 7½
|-
| 20 || align=left| || 2520 || −4 || +61 || −37 || −40 || +38 || −36 || +45 || =47 || +54 || =39 || +42 || +34 || =14 || 7½
|-
| 21 || align=left| || 2560 || +61 || +4 || =48 || −2 || =11 || +37 || =15 || =17 || +9 || −7 || =8 || −16 || =28 || 7
|-
| 22 || align=left| || 2505 || =5 || =28 || −11 || +27 || =47 || =25 || +46 || −15 || +41 || +48 || −16 || +37 || −18 || 7
|-
| 23 || align=left| || 2495 || =34 || =10 || =19 || +36 || =51 || =16 || −17 || =44 || −39 || +43 || =35 || =26 || +49 || 7
|-
| 24 || align=left| || 2525 || =10 || −34 || +45 || −17 || +58 || −4 || +43 || +39 || =50 || −37 || +44 || =18 || =27 || 7
|-
| 25 || align=left| || 2590 || +46 || =63 || +50 || −29 || −9 || =22 || =39 || =49 || +44 || =27 || +30 || =15 || −8 || 7
|-
| 26 || align=left| || 2560 || =1 || =18 || +38 || −30 || =31 || =46 || =63 || =34 || =36 || =42 || =39 || =23 || +41 || 7
|-
| 27 || align=left| || 2550 || −51 || +59 || −10 || −22 || +64 || =32 || +57 || =37 || +34 || =25 || =18 || =36 || =24 || 7
|-
| 28 || align=left| || 2600 || =64 || =22 || =32 || +58 || −6 || =47 || =41 || =36 || =33 || +31 || −14 || +45 || =21 || 7
|-
| 29 || align=left| || 2570 || +60 || =15 || +9 || +25 || −1 || =10 || −6 || +50 || =17 || −3 || −19 || =39 || =35 || 6½
|-
| 30 || align=left| || 2575 || +59 || =51 || =18 || +26 || =16 || =6 || −10 || =48 || −4 || +33 || −25 || =41 || =36 || 6½
|-
| 31 || align=left| || 2535 || =6 || −17 || =64 || +38 || =26 || +51 || =18 || =14 || −16 || −28 || =32 || +44 || =37 || 6½
|-
| 32 || align=left| || 2520 || =3 || =11 || =28 || −50 || =36 || =27 || =53 || =54 || −19 || +55 || =31 || =48 || +56 || 6½
|-
| 33 || align=left| || 2530 || =17 || −6 || +62 || =19 || −4 || =49 || =42 || +46 || =28 || −30 || −45 || +51 || +48 || 6½
|-
| 34 || align=left| || 2600 || =23 || +24 || +63 || −48 || +50 || −12 || −13 || =26 || −27 || +52 || +40 || −20 || =39 || 6½
|-
| 35 || align=left| || 2485 || =37 || =19 || =36 || −39 || =49 || =42 || −56 || +55 || +47 || =40 || =23 || =50 || =29 || 6½
|-
| 36 || align=left| || 2580 || +52 || −12 || =35 || −23 || =32 || +20 || =37 || =28 || =26 || +56 || −15 || =27 || =30 || 6½
|-
| 37 || align=left| || 2595 || =35 || =55 || +20 || −12 || +43 || −21 || =36 || =27 || +49 || +24 || −3 || −22 || =31 || 6½
|-
| 38 || align=left| || 2465 || =7 || =39 || −26 || −31 || −20 || =60 || =59 || +58 || =53 || +47 || =48 || =42 || +50 || 6½
|-
| 39 || align=left| || 2570 || =62 || =38 || =54 || +35 || −10 || =41 || =25 || −24 || +23 || =20 || =26 || =29 || =34 || 6½
|-
| 40 || align=left| || 2520 || −15 || =60 || =42 || +20 || +63 || =50 || −8 || +56 || −18 || =35 || −34 || =49 || =45 || 6
|-
| 41 || align=left| || 2485 || −48 || −2 || =59 || +60 || +56 || =39 || =28 || =42 || −22 || +49 || =50 || =30 || −26 || 6
|-
| 42 || align=left| || 2540 || =18 || −1 || =40 || +64 || −19 || =35 || =33 || =41 || +51 || =26 || −20 || =38 || =46 || 6
|-
| 43 || align=left| || 2545 || −12 || +52 || −2 || +53 || −37 || =57 || −24 || −51 || +61 || −23 || +58 || =54 || +55 || 6
|-
| 44 || align=left| || 2525 || =11 || −3 || −49 || +62 || −55 || +58 || +51 || =23 || −25 || +57 || −24 || −31 || +54 || 6
|-
| 45 || align=left| || 2535 || =9 || −50 || −24 || =59 || +52 || −56 || −20 || =57 || +60 || +54 || +33 || −28 || =40 || 6
|-
| 46 || align=left||| 2475 || −25 || +47 || =58 || =4 || =54 || =26 || −22 || −33 || −57 || +62 || =56 || +52 || =42 || 6
|-
| 47 || align=left| || 2550 || −63 || −46 || +57 || +52 || =22 || =28 || −3 || =20 || −35 || −38 || +60 || =56 || +59 || 6
|-
| 48 || align=left| || 2590 || +41 || +54 || =21 || +34 || =5 || −2 || −9 || =30 || −7 || −22 || =38 || =32 || −33 || 5½
|-
| 49 || align=left| || 2535 || =50 || −9 || +44 || −3 || =35 || =33 || +55 || =25 || −37 || −41 || +53 || =40 || −23 || 5½
|-
| 50 || align=left| || 2630 || =49 || +45 || −25 || +32 || −34 || =40 || +54 || −29 || =24 || −19 || =41 || =35 || −38 || 5½
|-
| 51 || align=left| || 2650 || +27 || =30 || −5 || =13 || =23 || −31 || −44 || +43 || −42 || =53 || =52 || −33 || +60 || 5½
|-
| 52 || align=left| || 2435 || −36 || −43 || +61 || −47 || −45 || +64 || +62 || =53 || =56 || −34 || =51 || −46 || +58 || 5½
|-
| 53 || align=left| || 2570 || −58 || −13 || +60 || −43 || −57 || +59 || =32 || =58 || =38 || =51 || −49 || =62 || +61 || 5½
|-
| 54 || align=left| || 2560 || +2 || −48 || =39 || =63 || =46 || =3 || −50 || =32 || −20 || −45 || +61 || =43 || −44 || 5
|-
| 55 || align=left| || 2465 || =19 || =37 || =56 || −9 || +44 || −63 || −49 || −35 || +59 || −32 || +62 || =61 || −43 || 5
|-
| 56 || align=left| || 2555 || −16 || +57 || =55 || −18 || −41 || +45 || +35 || −40 || =52 || −36 || =46 || =47 || −32 || 5
|-
| 57 || align=left| || 2440 || −14 || −56 || −47 || +61 || +53 || =43 || −27 || =45 || +46 || −44 || =59 || −60 || =62 || 5
|-
| 58 || align=left| || 2375 || +53 || −8 || =46 || −28 || −24 || −44 || =60 || −38 || =62 || =61 || −43 || +59 || −52 || 4
|-
| 59 || align=left| || 2425 || −30 || −27 || =41 || =45 || =62 || −53 || =38 || =61 || −55 || +60 || =57 || −58 || −47 || 4
|-
| 60 || align=left| || 2410 || −29 || =40 || −53 || −41 || =61 || =38 || =58 || =62 || −45 || −59 || −47 || +57 || −51 || 3½
|-
| 61 || align=left| || 2335 || −21 || −20 || −52 || −57 || =60 || =62 || +64 || =59 || −43 || =58 || −54 || =55 || −53 || 3½
|-
| 62 || align=left| || 2400 || =39 || −7 || −33 || −44 || =59 || =61 || −52 || =60 || =58 || −46 || −55 || =53 || =57 || 3½
|-
| 63 || align=left| || 2655 || +47 || =25 || −34 || =54 || −40 || +55 || =26 || - || - || - || - || - || - || 3½
|-
| 64 || align=left| || 2490 || =28 || −5 || =31 || −42 || −27 || −52 || −61 || - || - || - || - || - || - || 1
|}

Salov and Thipsay withdrew after seven rounds.

1991–93 Candidates Tournament
The final four players from the 1988–90 Candidates tournament—Karpov, Timman, Yusupov and Speelman—were seeded directly into the Candidates. They were joined by the top 11 finishers from the Interzonal. These 15 players played a series of Candidates matches. If matches were tied after the allotted games, extra pairs of rapid chess games were played until one player had the lead.

The preliminary matches were played in Sarajevo (Timman-Hübner and Gelfand-Nikolić), Wijk aan Zee (Korchnoi-Sax and Yusupov-Dolmatov), Riga (Ivanchuk-Yudasin), London (Short-Speelman), and Madras (Anand-Dreev) in January and February 1991. All four quarterfinals were played in Brussels in August 1991, both semifinals in Linares in April 1992, and the final in San Lorenzo del Escorial in January 1993.

1993 PCA match
Before the match could take place, both Kasparov and Short complained of corruption and a lack of professionalism within FIDE and split from FIDE to set up the Professional Chess Association (PCA), under whose auspices they held their match. The event was orchestrated largely by Raymond Keene. Keene brought the event to London (FIDE had planned it for Manchester), and England was whipped up into something of a chess fever: Channel 4 broadcast some 81 programmes on the match, the BBC also had coverage, and Short appeared in television beer commercials. The Kasparov–Short final was best of 24 games, played in London in September and October 1993.

{| class="wikitable" style="text-align:center"
|+PCA World Chess Championship Match 1993
|-
! !! Rating !! 1 !! 2 !! 3 !! 4 !! 5 !! 6 !! 7 !! 8 !! 9 !! 10 !! 11 !! 12 !! 13 !! 14 !! 15 !! 16 !! 17 !! 18 !! 19 !! 20 !! Total
|-
| align=left |  || 2815
| 1 ||style="background:black; color:white"| ½ || 1 ||style="background:black; color:white"| 1 || ½ ||style="background:black; color:white"| ½ || 1 ||style="background:black; color:white"| ½ || 1 ||style="background:black; color:white"| ½ || ½ ||style="background:black; color:white"| ½ || ½ ||style="background:black; color:white"| ½ || 1 ||style="background:black; color:white"| 0 || ½ ||style="background:black; color:white"| ½ || ½ ||style="background:black; color:white"| ½ || 12½
|-
| align=left |  || 2665
|style="background:black; color:white"| 0 || ½ ||style="background:black; color:white"| 0 || 0 ||style="background:black; color:white"| ½ || ½ ||style="background:black; color:white"| 0 || ½ ||style="background:black; color:white"| 0 || ½ 
|style="background:black; color:white"| ½ || ½ ||style="background:black; color:white"| ½ || ½ ||style="background:black; color:white"| 0 || 1 ||style="background:black; color:white"| ½ || ½ ||style="background:black; color:white"| ½ || ½ || 7½
|}

After the actual match, the players filled out the last four days of the playing schedule by playing a series of seven exhibition games (with openings chosen by the arbiter) that Kasparov won 5–2 (+4−1=2). There was also a game in which Kasparov and Short teamed up to play against the commentary team (which lost). In the wake of the decisive victory by Kasparov, interest in chess in the UK soon died down.

1993 FIDE match

As a result of the unauthorized PCA match, FIDE stripped Kasparov of his title, removed him and Short from their rating lists, and arranged an "official" match between Timman and Karpov, whom Short had beaten in the Candidates final and semifinal respectively. The FIDE match was played in Zwolle, Arnhem, Amsterdam, and Jakarta in September to November 1993.

{| class="wikitable" style="text-align:center"
|+FIDE World Chess Championship Match 1993
|-
! !! Rating !! 1 !! 2 !! 3 !! 4 !! 5 !! 6 !! 7 !! 8 !! 9 !! 10 !! 11 !! 12 !! 13 !! 14 !! 15 !! 16 !! 17 !! 18 !! 19 !! 20 !! 21 !! Total
|-
| align=left |  || 2620
| 0 ||style="background:black; color:white"| 1 || ½ ||style="background:black; color:white"| ½ || ½ ||style="background:black; color:white"| 0 || ½ ||style="background:black; color:white"| ½ || ½ ||style="background:black; color:white"| 0 || ½ ||style="background:black; color:white"| ½ || ½ ||style="background:black; color:white"| 0 || 0 ||style="background:black; color:white"| 0 || ½ ||style="background:black; color:white"| ½ || ½ ||style="background:black; color:white"| 1 || ½ || 8½
|-
| align=left |  || 2760
|style="background:black; color:white"| 1 || 0 ||style="background:black; color:white"| ½ || ½ ||style="background:black; color:white"| ½ || 1 ||style="background:black; color:white"| ½ || ½ ||style="background:black; color:white"| ½ || 1 
|style="background:black; color:white"| ½ || ½ ||style="background:black; color:white"| ½ || 1 ||style="background:black; color:white"| 1 || 1 ||style="background:black; color:white"| ½ || ½ ||style="background:black; color:white"| ½ || 0 ||style="background:black; color:white"| ½ || 12½
|}

Karpov won the best-of-24 match and thus regained the FIDE championship title that he had previously held from 1975 to 1985 before losing it to Kasparov.

References

1993
1993 in chess
Garry Kasparov